Battistini is an underground station on Line A of the Rome Metro, situated at the junction of Via Mattia Battistini and Via Ennio Bonifazi, in the 14th district. The station was inaugurated, together with the others from Valle Aurelia - Battistini on 1 January 2000 since when it has been the northernmost station on Line A.

Services
This station has:
 Access for the disabled
 177 Park and Ride spaces
 Ticket office
 Escalators

Located nearby
 Via Boccea
 Forte Boccea
 Santa Sofia a Via Boccea

References

External links

 Battistini station on the Rome public transport site (in Italian)

Rome Metro Line A stations
Railway stations opened in 2000
2000 establishments in Italy
Rome Q. XXVII Primavalle
Railway stations in Italy opened in the 21st century